Şıxımpeştə (also, Shekhin-Peshta and Shykhympeshta) is a village in the Astara Rayon of Azerbaijan. The village forms part of the municipality of Motolayataq.

References 

Populated places in Astara District